Stollhofen is a place near Rheinmünster, Rastatt district, Baden-Württemberg, Germany.  It lies on the river Sulzbach, and was first mentioned in documents in 1154 and given city status in the 13th century.

It gives its name to the Lines of Stollhofen, a 10-mile defensive line between Stollhofen and Bühl constructed in 1703 during the War of the Spanish Succession.  The town was captured in 1707 and its fortifications demolished.

References

Rastatt (district)
Villages in Baden-Württemberg